USS S-26 (SS-131) was an S-class submarine of the United States Navy.  She was lost in a collision with a friendly escort ship in late January 1942.

Construction and commissioning
S-26′s keel was laid down on 7 November 1919 by Bethlehem Shipbuilding Corporation's Fore River Shipyard in Quincy, Massachusetts. She launched on 22 August 1922, sponsored by Mrs. Carlos Bean, and commissioned on 15 October 1923.

Service history

1923–1942
Operating from New London, Connecticut, from 1923 to 1925, S-26 visited St. Thomas in the United States Virgin Islands and Trinidad from January to April 1924 and Hawaii from 27 April to 30 May 1925. Cruising from California ports, mainly Mare Island, San Diego, and San Pedro, S-26 served in the Panama Canal area from March to May 1927, visited Hawaii again during the summers of 1927 to 1928, again served in the Panama Canal area in February 1929, and made visits to Hawaii during the summers of 1929 and 1930.

S-26 departed San Diego on 1 December 1930 and arrived at Pearl Harbor, Hawaii, on 12 December 1930. She then served at Pearl Harbor until 15 October 1938, when she departed to return to New London. She arrived at on 25 March 1939 and entered a period in commission in reserve with a partial crew there on 15 April 1939. She resumed full duty on 1 July 1940. She then performed duty at New London and hydrogen tests at Washington, D.C.

After the United States entered World War II with the Japanese attack on Pearl Harbor of 7 December 1941, S-26 departed New London on 10 December 1941 and arrived at Coco Solo, Panama on 19 December 1941. She subsequently conducted her first war patrol in the waters of the Pacific Ocean off Panama, but did not encounter enemy forces.

Loss
All four submarines were on the surface, and all five vessels operated without navigation lights to reduce the chance of detection by enemy forces, with PC-460 steaming  ahead of the leading submarine, S-21. After the vessels were at sea in the Gulf of Panama, PC-460 made a visual signal at 22:10 to the submarines that she intended to make a wide, 180-degree turn to starboard to return to port and that they could proceed with their assigned duties. Only S-21 received the message. PC-460 then executed her turn, and shortly thereafter encountered S-26, which was running  behind S-21. The two darkened vessels sighted each other at close range. PC-460 put her engines full astern, but this caused them to fail. Both vessels took evasive action to avoid a collision, but too late, and PC-460 rammed S-26 amidships on her starboard side at 22:23. The impact tore a large hole in S-26′s side and caused her to roll, throwing three of the four men on her bridge overboard.

S-26′s only survivors were the three men — her commanding officer, executive officer, and a lookout — who went overboard from her bridge. The rest of her crew — three officers and 43 crew members, one of whom also had been on her bridge — were killed. Rescue operations began on the morning of 25 January 1942, with divers making 25 dives to the wreck over the following days in the hope of finding men still alive in S-26′s hull, but they found no signs of life. S-26′s  wreck lies upright on the seabed and is a protected war grave.

See also
List of lost United States submarines

References

External links
On Eternal Patrol: USS S-26

United States S-class submarines
World War II submarines of the United States
United States submarine accidents
Lost submarines of the United States
Shipwrecks in the Gulf of Panama
Ships built in Quincy, Massachusetts
1922 ships
Submarines sunk in collisions
Friendly fire incidents of World War II
Maritime incidents in January 1942
World War II shipwrecks in the Pacific Ocean
Submarines sunk by United States warships